Zeeman energy, or the external field energy, is the potential energy of a magnetised body in an external magnetic field. It is named after the Dutch physicist Pieter Zeeman, primarily known for the Zeeman effect. In SI units, it is given by

where HExt is the external field, M the local magnetisation, and the integral is done over the volume of the body. This is the statistical average (over a 
unit volume macroscopic sample) of a corresponding microscopic Hamiltonial (energy) for each individual magnetic moment m, which is however experiencing a local induction B:

References 
 F. Barozzi, F. Gasparini, Fondamenti di Elettrotecnica: Elettromagnetismo, UTET Torino, 1989
 Hubert, A. and Schäfer, R. Magnetic domains: the analysis of magnetic microstructures, Springer-Verlag, 1998

Magnetism
Physical phenomena